is the 21st single by Japanese idol duo Wink. Written by Yasushi Akimoto and James Shimoji, the single was released on May 25, 1994, by Polystar Records.

Background and release 
"Twinkle Twinkle" was used by Tokyo City Keiba for its "Twinkle Race" commercials. The B-side, "Tasty", was used by Dunkin' Donuts for their commercial featuring Wink.

"Twinkle Twinkle" peaked at No. 28 on the Oricon's weekly charts and sold over 74,000 copies.

Track listing

Chart positions 
Weekly charts

Year-end charts

Twinkle Twinkle 2017 

To promote Tokyo City Keiba's "Twinkle Race 2017", former Wink member Shoko Aida collaborated with the comedy duo Oriental Radio to release a new recording of "Twinkle Twinkle" as a digital single on June 28, 2017. The song features additional rap lyrics by Mitsuhiro Fukada and arrangement by DJ Juvenile. The music video stars fashion model Rola and Oriental Radio.

Track listing

References

External links 
 
 

1994 singles
1994 songs
2017 singles
Wink (duo) songs
Japanese-language songs
Songs with lyrics by Yasushi Akimoto